Folk-Holloway House is a historic home located at Pomaria, Newberry County, South Carolina.  It was built about 1835, and is a two-story, single pile frame I-house. It features a recessed front porch deck and freestanding columns. The house reflects Federal and Greek Revival style design elements.

It was listed on the National Register of Historic Places in 1992.

References

Houses on the National Register of Historic Places in South Carolina
Greek Revival houses in South Carolina
Federal architecture in South Carolina
Houses completed in 1835
Houses in Newberry County, South Carolina
National Register of Historic Places in Newberry County, South Carolina